Jurosomatic illness is a pseudoscientific assumption of a somatic illness that is described as being brought on by a pending lawsuit. It is not an illness recognized by the medical or mental health communities, nor is it an illness described in any medical or mental health diagnostic manual. 

A segment of John Stossel's show on lawsuit abuse (aired June 14, 2012) was devoted to reporting on this illness. Senator John Barrasso (R-Wyo.), an orthopedic surgeon by education, who was interviewed by Stossel for the episode stated that this is an illness that he had studied in medical school. He described it as a syndrome arising from a legitimate injury and legitimate pain and suffering, which drags out for the duration of the lawsuit, brought on by the stress and anxiety of the continuing lawsuit, as well as anger and fixation on the injury associated with it.

Stossel had also quoted a British psychiatrist Theodore Dalrymple as saying:

See also
 Somatic psychology
Conversion disorder
Somatic symptom disorder
Secondary gains

References

Somatic psychology
Osteopathic medicine
Somatic symptom disorders